Sangani Kiran Kumar (born 10 September 1975) is an Indian former cricketer. He played seven first-class matches for Hyderabad between 1995 and 1997.

See also
 List of Hyderabad cricketers

References

External links
 

1975 births
Living people
Indian cricketers
Hyderabad cricketers
Cricketers from Hyderabad, India